Arie "Aad" de Graaf (22 October 1939 – 21 July 1995) was a Dutch track cyclist who was active between 1959 and 1966. He won national sprint titles in 1960–1962 and finished second in 1959 and 1963–1965. He competed in the sprint at the 1960 and 1964 Summer Olympics, but failed to reach the finals; in 1964 he finished in fourth place in the 2 km tandem event.

See also
 List of Dutch Olympic cyclists

References

External links
 

1939 births
1995 deaths
Dutch male cyclists
Olympic cyclists of the Netherlands
Cyclists at the 1960 Summer Olympics
Cyclists at the 1964 Summer Olympics
Cyclists from Rotterdam